Irma Shiolashvili, or Irma Shiolashvili-Britze (born 29 March 1974 in Dedoplistsqaro) is a Georgian poet, translator and journalist.

Biography 
Irma Shiolashvili was born in 1974 in Dedoplistsqaro, Georgia. She studied journalism at Tbilisi State University and later at University of Bonn, Germany. During her studies in Tbilisi she worked in the cultural department of the National Georgian Television, where she produced TV programs about contemporary Georgian writers.

In 1995, she became one of the youngest members of the Georgian Writers' Union.

In 1999, Shiolashvili moved to Germany, where, in 2005, she defended PhD thesis on German and Georgian political postwar poetry.

In 2007, she was admitted to the European Writers' Association 'The Kogge'.

In 2012, her book A Bridge of colourful leaves was published in German translation by Pop Publishing House Ludwigsburg/Germany (Kaukasische Bibliothek, Volume 3). Her poems have been also translated into Russian, English and French.

Shiolashvili lives in Bonn and works as a journalist and lecturer.

Works

Books
 Monday, Saunje Publishing, 2013, 
 A Bridge of Colourful Leaves, Editor Miho Mosulishvili, Saari Publishing, 2009, 
 Trace of Tears, Merani Publishing, 2002,  
 The Blue Bow, Mecniereba Publishing, 1996
 Non-existing Word, Merani Publishing, 1992

Translations
 Techno der Jaguare – Neue Erzählerinnen aus Georgien, Verlag Frankfurter Verlagsanstalt, 2013,

Prizes and awards
 Prize of the successful woman emigrant, Tbilisi, 2017

References

Sources
 SHIOLASHVLI IRMA
 Two verses by Irma Shiolashvili, Translated into English by Manana Matiashvili and Dana Weber
 Irma Schiolaschwili (literatursalon-euterpe.de)
 Irma Schiolaschwili (wp.pop-verlag.com)

1974 births
Living people
Poets from Georgia (country)
Writers from Georgia (country)
Women poets from Georgia (country)
Tbilisi State University alumni
Translators from Georgia (country)
Journalists from Georgia (country)